The Priscilla is a wooden bark that is historically significant for being the first of several ships to bring Portuguese immigrants to the Hawaiian Islands, the Priscilla arriving on 30 September 1878 to Honolulu harbor with 120 settlers recruited from the Madeira Islands of Portugal.

See also
 Portuguese immigration to Hawaii

References

Victorian-era passenger ships of the United Kingdom
Portuguese immigration to Hawaii